Wife, Mother, Murderer is a 1991 American made-for-television drama film directed by Mel Damski and starring Judith Light, David Ogden Stiers, Kellie Overbey, David Dukes, and Whip Hubley. The screenplay concerns Alabama murderer Marie Hilley.

Cast
Judith Light.....Marie Hilley/Robbi/Terri
David Ogden Stiers.....John Homan
Kellie Overbey.....Carol Hilley
David Dukes.....Joe Hubbard
Whip Hubley.....Lt. Gary Carroll

External links
 
 

1990s biographical drama films
1991 crime drama films
1991 films
1991 television films
American crime drama films
American serial killer films
American drama television films
Biographical films about criminals
1990s English-language films
Films directed by Mel Damski
Films scored by Mark Snow
Films set in Alabama
Films set in the 1970s
Films set in the 1980s
Poisoning in film
1990s American films